The Martyrdom of Saint Sebastian is a work by Piero del Pollaiuolo, commissioned by the Florentine Pucci family and now in the National Gallery, London.

History
The Pucci family commissioned it as the altarpiece for the family chapel, the oratory dedicated to Saint Sebastian in the church of Santissima Annunziata, Florence. Giorgio Vasari dates it to 1475 but misattributes it to Piero's brother, the more famous and artistically talented Antonio – a misattribution that lasted until the present day.

Roberto Pucci withdrew the work from the oratory on the pretext of restoration but then in 1857 sold it to the National Gallery.

Analysis
It is considered Piero's masterpiece, with a more rigid geometric control on the composition than in his previous works, without giving up his usual naturalness of poses and movement – the four archers in the foreground form two symmetrical poses, with the two central ones reloading and the two on the edges firing, in perfect equilibrium either side of the central post to which Sebastian is tied.

It can be contrasted with its near-contemporary, the Saint Sebastian by Botticelli, which instead puts the figure of the saint in isolation in a Flemish-inspired landscape. Borrowed from the Botticelli painting is the San Sebastiano by Francesco Botticini, formerly attributed to Andrea del Castagno, dated to the years immediately after 1474.

Gallery

Bibliography
Aldo Galli, I Pollaiolo, "Galleria delle arti" series number 7, Milano, 5 Continents Editions, 2005, p. 36.
Alessandro Cecchi, Botticelli e l’età di Lorenzo il Magnifico, in the series  "I grandi maestri dell’arte. L’artista e il suo tempo", Firenze, E – ducation.it, 2007, p. 115.
National Gallery site

Collections of the National Gallery, London
Paintings about death
Christian art about death
Altarpieces
Pollaiuolo
Torture in art
Paintings by Piero del Pollaiuolo